Georgios Vakouftsis (born 30 January 1980) is a Greek footballer. He last played for PAEEK FC in Cyprus, previously he played for Anagennisi Karditsa in the Gamma Ethniki. A striker, he is 192 cm tall.

Career 
Born in Kalabaka, Vakouftsis began playing football for Panathinaikos' youth side. His body shape led Fiorentina's scouts to sign him from Panathinaikos youth team in 1999. His early performance was one of the key factors for Vakouftsis to gain the nickname "Il Greco Batistuta", due to the Argentine legend striker of Viola. His return in the Greek Superleague for Iraklis FC on loan did not meet expectations, and in 2002 he moved in Cyprus to play for APOEL and later for rivals AC Omonia. In Cyprus Vakouftsis proved his calibre, scoring 52 goals in 113 appearances for the two clubs. In 2008, he moved back in Greece to play for Cretan club Ergotelis F.C. and in the summer of 2009 he signed for Skoda Xanthi F.C. Vakouftsis played only three games for Xanthi in the league and because he was considered as a backup for the first team he requested a transfer. On 14 January 2010 he signed for Anagennisi Karditsa F.C. which caused much surprise in the Greek football transfer market. His contract is for six months and he is considered as a great addition to the squad. In January 2011 he returned to Cyprus to play for PAEEK FC in the second division.

His former clubs include: Panathinaikos, ACF Fiorentina, Ravenna Calcio, Iraklis FC, APOEL, AC Omonia, Ergotelis F.C. and Skoda Xanthi F.C.

References

External links 
 Profile at Onsports.gr
 footballplus.com

1980 births
Living people
People from Kalabaka
Greek footballers
Greece under-21 international footballers
Association football forwards
Super League Greece players
Serie A players
Serie B players
Cypriot First Division players
Panathinaikos F.C. players
APOEL FC players
AC Omonia players
ACF Fiorentina players
Ravenna F.C. players
Ergotelis F.C. players
Iraklis Thessaloniki F.C. players
Xanthi F.C. players
Anagennisi Karditsa F.C. players
PAEEK players
Greek expatriate footballers
Expatriate footballers in Italy
Expatriate footballers in Cyprus
Footballers from Thessaly